Robert Lindley Murray defeated Nathaniel W. Niles 5–7, 8–6, 6–3, 6–3 in the final to win the men's singles tennis title at the 1917 U.S. National Championships. The event was held at the West Side Tennis Club in Forest Hills, New York.  The tournament was renamed National Patriotic Tournament in support of the war effort. No trophies were handed out to the winners and the entrance fees were dedicated to the American Red Cross.

Final eight

References

External links
 1917 U.S. National Championships on ITFtennis.com, the source for this draw

Men's singles
1917